Eulaliopsis sykesii is a perennial plant belonging to the grass family. It is found in Nepal and the Eastern Himalayas. It was first scientifically described by Bor in 1957.

References

Flora of Asia
Plants described in 1957
Andropogoneae